Dmitry Gorshkov (born 29 April 1967 in Moscow) is a Russian water polo player who played on the silver medal squad at the 2000 Summer Olympics and the bronze medal squads at the 1992 Summer Olympics and 2004 Summer Olympics.

At the 2000 Summer Olympics, Gorshkov scored the game-winning goal during a marathon semi-final game against Spain.

See also
 Russia men's Olympic water polo team records and statistics
 List of Olympic medalists in water polo (men)
 List of players who have appeared in multiple men's Olympic water polo tournaments
 List of World Aquatics Championships medalists in water polo

External links
 

1967 births
Living people
Soviet male water polo players
Russian male water polo players
Water polo players at the 1992 Summer Olympics
Water polo players at the 1996 Summer Olympics
Water polo players at the 2000 Summer Olympics
Water polo players at the 2004 Summer Olympics
Olympic water polo players of the Unified Team
Olympic water polo players of Russia
Olympic bronze medalists for the Unified Team
Olympic silver medalists for Russia
Olympic bronze medalists for Russia
Olympic medalists in water polo
Medalists at the 2004 Summer Olympics
Sportspeople from Moscow
Medalists at the 2000 Summer Olympics
Medalists at the 1992 Summer Olympics